The 2011 Tour of Britain was the eighth running of the latest incarnation of the Tour of Britain and the 72nd British tour in total. The race started on 11 September in Peebles, Scotland and finished on 18 September in London, England, with the race also visiting Wales for one stage.

The race consisted of eight stages – down from the original itinerary of nine stages due to bad weather – and included the Tour's first individual time trial since 2007, as part of two stages on the race's final day, with a criterium to finish the race. The race was held as part of the 2010–2011 UCI Europe Tour, and was categorised by the UCI as a 2.1 category race.

The race was won by  rider Lars Boom, who claimed the leader's gold jersey after two stage victories, as well as a strong finish on the individual time trial stage. Boom maintained his advantage to the end of the race, with a winning margin over runner-up 's Steve Cummings of 36 seconds, and 's Jan Bárta completed the podium, 19 seconds behind Cummings and 55 seconds down on Boom.

As well as Thomas' points victory,  finished on top of the teams classification.

Participating teams

UCI ProTeams
 GRM – 
 THR – 
 LEO – 
 RAB – 
 SKY – 
 VCD – 

UCI Professional Continental teams
 APP – 
 EUC – 
 TSV – 
 UHC – 

UCI Continental teams
 EDR – 
 MPT – 
 RAL – 
 RCS – 
 SGS – 
 SKT –

Stages

Stage 1
11 September 2011 – Peebles to Dumfries, 

A pair of riders – 's Pieter Ghyllebert and 's Russell Hampton – made the early breakaway from the field, locking out the top two placings at each of the three intermediate sprint points and the three categorised climbs during the stage. Ghyllebert finished first at the sprints, and thus took the race's first sprints jersey, while Hampton earned the polka-dot jersey for heading the mountains classification, and also earned the award for the day's most combative rider. The breakaway, which had an advantage of six minutes over the field at one point during the stage, was caught with around  remaining, which would ultimately set up a sprint finish in Dumfries.

,  and  moved their riders towards the front of the field, to win the sprint for the line and the ten-second time bonus available for the first rider to complete the stage. As it was,  were the strongest in the closing stages and Mark Renshaw led Mark Cavendish – only racing in the Tour with special dispensation from the Union Cycliste Internationale after his stage 4 exit from the Vuelta a España – out to claim the stage victory, his first in the race since 2007. The stage victory gave Cavendish the lead in the general classification, and also the points classification, from points gained at the finish. Renshaw finished just behind Cavendish, with 's Theo Bos completing the top three placings.

Stage 2
12 September 2011 – Kendal to Blackpool, 

Prior to the start of the stage, race organisers cancelled the stage on police advice due to high winds in Northern England, as Hurricane Katia, now a post-tropical cyclone hit the country.

Remained the General Classification after Stage 2

Stage 3
13 September 2011 – Stoke-on-Trent to Stoke-on-Trent, 

Although not as prominent as the previous day, windy conditions caused problems for the riders during the stage, with the field being split into several groups, behind a trio of breakaway riders. 's Boy Van Poppel, 's Andrew Fenn, and the mountains classification leader Russell Hampton of  formed the day's breakaway, and they accelerated away from the field to a maximum advantage of over three minutes. The lead trio also took the maximum points from the first two intermediate sprints and the second category climb at Ramshorn. They stayed ahead of the field – and were later joined by  rider Jonathan Tiernan-Locke – until just after Gun Hill, where ,  and  advanced some of their riders into an echelon of 27 riders. After advancing all six of their riders into the echelon,  sent one of their riders on the attack with around  remaining on the stage.

The newly crowned British time trial champion Alex Dowsett attempted to take a solo victory for the second time in a few weeks, after a similar performance at the Tour du Poitou-Charentes a couple weeks prior to the Tour of Britain. Dowsett was caught within the final  of the stage, which allowed several teams to launch mini-attacks on their rivals, in an attempt to break them. Boom won the stage ahead of Matthews, with Geraint Thomas best of the rest in third for Team Sky, ahead of team-mate Steve Cummings and Cavendish. Boom's win – coupled with bonus seconds on the finish and intermediate sprints – enabled him to take the general classification lead from Cavendish by three seconds.

Stage 4
14 September 2011 – Welshpool to Caerphilly, 

Just like the previous day's stage, a trio of riders went away from the field to form the day's breakaway. 's Kristian House, 's Jack Bauer, and the sprints classification leader Pieter Ghyllebert of  formed the breakaway, and they accelerated away from the field to a maximum advantage of almost six minutes. The lead trio also took the maximum points from all three intermediate sprints – a result that boosted Ghyllebert's lead in the sprints classification – and the first two categorised climbs of the day, at Llyswen Hill and over the first category climb at the Brecon Beacons.

The field steadily brought back the breakaway, and by the foot of the final climb of the day coming at Caerphilly mountain with just  remaining, the field was all back together again. The climb split the field apart so much so, that only 22 riders were in contention of winning the stage at Caerphilly Castle. The world road race champion, Thor Hushovd, was set up for the sprint by  team-mate Julian Dean, and proceeded to take the stage victory. Lars Boom, the race leader, finished behind Hushovd, and ahead of Cesare Benedetti, Ian Bibby and Boy Van Poppel. Boom extended his lead in the general classification, thanks to his time bonus of six seconds on the finish line, and also assumed the lead of the points classification from Mark Cavendish.

Stage 5
15 September 2011 – Exeter to Exmouth, 

After several mini-attacks in the early running of the stage, it was not until around  into the stage that the breakaway developed. The breakaway had been instigated by  rider Jonathan Tiernan-Locke at the foot of the first climb at Haytor Rocks, and would eventually swell to a total of thirteen riders, who held a maximum advantage of almost six minutes. Tiernan-Locke, as well as winning maximum points at Haytor Rocks, claimed both of the second category climbs that were held later on the stage. As a result of his points on the day, he assumed the lead of the mountains classification from 's Russell Hampton, who had held the lead of the classification since the opening stage in Scotland.

The field brought back the breakaway quickly, although there was a counter-attack from the break, with Damien Gaudin of  going off the front with  remaining. Gaudin's bid for victory was eventually stunted within the closing  of the stage.  made their presence at the front of the field, in a bid to repeat their victory on Stage 1 with Mark Cavendish. However, Cavendish decided not to fully sprint for the line to allow Mark Renshaw – a rider who has led out Cavendish to many of his victories over their time at the team – to take the stage victory. Cavendish led the rest of the field over the line, ahead of Robert Förster, Geraint Thomas and Andrew Fenn. 's Lars Boom maintained his twelve-second lead in the general classification over Thomas, who took the lead of the points classification from Boom.

Stage 6
16 September 2011 – Taunton to Wells, 

The sprint itself was won by race leader Lars Boom, putting another three seconds onto his overall lead, prior to the breakaway move, who held station off the front until the closing  of the stage, when 17 other riders bridged the gap to them, and provided for a reduced field sprint finish. Boom was the strongest rider in the remaining riders, and comfortably took the stage win, extending his general classification lead to 28 seconds over 's Leopold König, who finished third on the stage. Boom also regained the points classification lead from the delayed Thomas.

Stage 7
17 September 2011 – Bury St Edmunds to Sandringham, 

The breakaway was the key to the day's stage, having made an escape from the field after just , and ultimately held an advantage of almost 90 seconds all the way to the end of the stage. Bagdonas ultimately took the stage win ahead of Wilkinson, Claude and Neirynck, as Boom maintained his lead of 28 seconds in the general classification over 's Leopold König, ahead of the final day's split-stages. Boom and König both finished in the pack led home by Mark Cavendish, 83 seconds behind Bagdonas.

Stage 8a
18 September 2011 – London,  individual time trial (ITT)

Just like Flens before him, Wetterhall's time also managed to give him the best time for a while, and it was not until Lieuwe Westra of  that Wetterhall was displaced from the top spot.

Westra's time of 10' 19" remained unchallenged for another fifteen minutes – riders outside the top ten in the general classification left the start at one-minute intervals – until 's Alex Dowsett went round the course some five seconds quicker than Westra did. Dowsett's time was ultimately good enough for the stage victory, for his first victory in the race. As the top ten took to the course in two-minute intervals, it was Dowsett's team-mate Steve Cummings that made up the most ground on time, as he finished nine seconds off Dowsett's time, a result that would lift him from fifth place to second place in the general classification. Despite Cummings' position gain, he lost four seconds to race leader Lars Boom, as he finished the course marginally quicker than Westra, to claim second place on the stage.

Stage 8b
18 September 2011 – London, 

After starting the stage in dry conditions, rain started to fall towards the end of the eighth lap of the race, providing the race's 79 remaining riders with an added danger in the closing stages. House attacked off McLaughlin on the final lap, but was eventually swallowed up by the main field prior to the bunch sprint at the finish. Robert Förster of  led the sprint out ahead of Mark Renshaw and Geraint Thomas, but it was Mark Cavendish, who turned into the final straight in fifth position, who took the stage victory ahead of Renshaw – 's third one-two finish of the Tour – and allowed Cavendish to head to the UCI Road World Championships in Copenhagen, Denmark on a high. Lars Boom finished in the main field to seal the race victory, and he became the first Dutch rider to win the Tour of Britain. Despite his overall victory, Boom surrendered the victory in the points classification on the finish to Thomas, after his fourth place on the stage behind Cavendish, Renshaw and Förster.

Classification leadership

Notes

References

External links

2011
Tour of Britain
Tour of Britain
September 2011 sports events in the United Kingdom
2011 sports events in London